Ryūki, Ryuki or Ryuuki (written: , , , , , , or ) is a masculine Japanese given name. Notable people with the name include:

, Japanese professional wrestler
, Japanese writer, radio personality, actor, and voice actor
, Japanese footballer
, Japanese tennis player
, Japanese footballer
, Japanese footballer
, Japanese actor
, Japanese mixed martial artist

Japanese masculine given names